2 States is an Indian 2020 Malayalam-language romantic comedy starring Manu Pillai, Sharanya R Nair, Mukesh, and Vijayaraghavan.

Cast 
 Manu Pillai as Harikrishnan 
 Sharanya R Nair as Sushitha 
 Mukesh as Vijayaraghavan  
 Vijayaraghavan as Appappan 
 Aroul D. Shankar as Sushitha's father
 Shammi Thilakan as the nervous goon
 Pradeep Kottayam
 Vinod Kedamangalam
 John Vijay as Police Officer 
 Unni Nair
 Santhosh Keezhattoor
 Indrans as Judge (cameo appearance)

Release 
The film was set to release on Valentine's Day, but was postponed to 28 February.

The Times of India gave the film two-and-half out of five stars and stated that " The progression of the story is more or less predictable, except for a suspense element towards the end".

References

External links 

2020s Malayalam-language films
Indian romantic comedy films
2020 romantic comedy films
Films scored by Jakes Bejoy